Kovvatnet may refer to the following locations:

Kovvatnet, Finnmark, a lake in Alta Municipality in Finnmark county, Norway
Kovvatnet, Telemark, a lake in Hjartdal Municipality in Telemark county, Norway